Ceratrichia punctata is a species of butterfly in the family Hesperiidae. It is found in Cameroon and Angola. The habitat consists of forests.

References

Butterflies described in 1896
Hesperiinae
Butterflies of Africa